The Khodiyar Dam is a dam built on Shetrunji River in Gujarat in western India. The primary purpose of the dam is to provide water for irrigation. It was completed in 1967 and a canal off the reservoir's right bank was completed the next year.

References 

Dams in Gujarat
Dams completed in 1967
Amreli district
1967 establishments in Gujarat
20th-century architecture in India